Boophis idae (Ida's bright-eyed frog) is a species of frog in the family Mantellidae. It is endemic to Madagascar.

Distribution and habitat
The species is widely distributed in the eastern moist lowland and montane rainforests of Madagascar, from Nosy Boraha down to Ivohibe, at altitudes of 900–1,100 m. It also frequents swamps, marshes, and a variety of humid habitats in human use. It appears to be locally common throughout its range.

Conservation
Although the species is currently classified as Least concern by the IUCN, it is thought to be impacted by habitat loss due to agriculture, timber extraction, charcoal manufacture, and the spread of invasive species such as eucalypts.

References

idae
Endemic frogs of Madagascar
Amphibians described in 1867
Taxonomy articles created by Polbot